Costa Del Mar or simply Costa is an American manufacturer of polarized sunglasses based in Daytona Beach, Florida. It is a wholly owned subsidiary of EssilorLuxottica. Their sunglasses are popular in the sport sunglasses market, and are considered good for outdoor sports practicing, such as Summer activities, recreational fishing and boating. Costa's Baffin Sunglasses won Best of Show: Eyewear at ICAST 2018.

"Costa Del Mar" is Spanish for "coast of the sea".

History
Costa Del Mar was founded in 1983 by Ray Ferguson in Daytona Beach. By 1986, it was the official gear of the Stars & Stripes team in America's Cup yacht racing contest and quickly became popular among surfers and recreational fishermen due to its sun glare protection. The brand made an appearance in the 1987 video game California Games as one of the sponsors.

The brand was acquired by Essilor in 2013 for approximately $270 million.

In 2017, Costa partnered with NASCAR driver Austin Dillon to create a limited quantity of special edition sunglasses. Dillon won the 2018 Daytona 500.

In August 2017, a new vice-president of marketing by the name of TJ McMeniman was nominated.

The company was involved in a series of lawsuits for "deceptive trade practices".  These lawsuits were based on the warranty, which claimed that glasses would either be replaced or repaired for "a nominal fee".  The class action lawsuit alleged that the "nominal fee" was just shy of the actual price of a new pair of glasses.

In August 2019 the CEO, Holly Rush, was let go and all department heads report directly to Luxottica. In December 2019, it was announced that operations in Daytona Beach would cease by February 7, 2020 and the rest of the layoffs would be complete by September 2020. Most of the production of sunglasses will be manufactured at Luxottica's plant in Foothill Ranch, California.

Social responsibility 
Costa has a charity campaign called #OneCoast that helps victims of natural disasters by raising funds for the Red Cross hurricane relief program.

They also have a campaign called Costa+OCEARCH, as a result with a partnership with OCEARCH, also intended to raise funds to the non-governmental organization dedicated to protect ocean wildlife.

In 2018, Costa launched their Untangled Collection. This collection is a partnership with Bureo to reduce plastic waste from fishing nets in the ocean. Bureo collects the fishing nets and turns them into plastic pellets, which Costa uses to create these frames.

References

Manufacturing companies established in 1983
American companies established in 1983
1983 establishments in Florida
Eyewear companies of the United States
Eyewear brands of the United States
Manufacturing companies based in Florida
Companies based in Volusia County, Florida
Daytona Beach, Florida
Sunglasses
2013 mergers and acquisitions
American subsidiaries of foreign companies